Admiral Guido Venturoni (born 10 April 1934 in Teramo) is a retired Italian Navy officer who served as Chief of the Defence Staff before being appointed Chairman of the NATO Military Committee.

He served as Chief of Staff of the Italian Navy from 1992 to 1993 and from 1 Jan 1994 until 15 February 1999 served Chief of the Italian Defence General Staff.

He was appointed Chairman of the NATO Military Committee on 6 May 1999 and retired in 2002.

After his retirement he joined Leonardo-Finmeccanica as a Director and later Vice Chairman.

References

Living people
Italian admirals
1934 births
Chiefs of Defence Staff (Italy)
People from Teramo